MAB Corporation is an integrated property company that creates, owns and manages property assets and built environments throughout Australia. The company was founded in 1995 by Michael Buxton, who began his career working in his family's business, and Andrew Buxton, who started out working in the quarry and asphalt industry.

MAB Corporation is an Australian company that develops commercial, residential, retail and industrial properties. In particular, the company has played a significant role in reshaping the city of Melbourne, the capital of the south eastern state of Victoria.

Developments undertaken recently by MAB Corporation include the village of NewQuay in the Docklands precinct and Bundoora's billion dollar mixed-use estate, University Hill. The company also played a major role in the 'rebirth' and development of the city's once very industrial bay side suburb of Port Melbourne.

With $1.5 billion in projects completed or commenced, MAB Corporation generates approximately $200 million in annual sales, has net assets approaching $200 million and employs a number of people across a range of areas, including new projects and strategy innovation, developments, business parks, asset management and funds management; the latter handling approximately $200 million under management.

Hotel developments 

As of November 2006 the company operates the largest serviced apartment hotel complex in the Melbourne CBD under the name Docklands Serviced Apartments.  The complex has 340 apartments.

External links 
 MAB Corporation homepage
 Melbourne Hotel

References 
Star News Group 18 April 2007  - Property fund - By Michelle Carnovale
MAB Corporation sells 1.65 hectare site in Global Business Park in Tullamarine, Victoria to Peet Income Property Fund (PIPF) for A$9.1 million. Retrieved 28 April 2007.
The Age Business, 11 April 2007 - Business parks move with the times Discusses "MAB Corporation's $1 billion, 104-hectare mixed industrial-retail-commercial University Hill project in Bundoora." Retrieved 28 April 2007.

Real estate companies of Australia
Real estate companies established in 1995